Dominic Holden is an American journalist. He was National Lesbian and Gay Journalists Associations 2016 Journalist of the Year Award awardee, and one of The Advocates 50 most influential LGBTs in America in 2017. He was director of Seattle Hempfest and an editor at Seattle's The Stranger alternative newspaper for six years. Since 2015 he has written for Buzzfeed News. Holden appeared in the 2013 documentary Evergreen: The Road to Legalization. In 2019, The New York Times reported that he was one of the leaders of an effort to unionize employees at Buzzfeed.

His father, Ronald Holden, is a Seattle food writer, who worked at KING-TV and was executive editor at the other Seattle alt-weekly, Seattle Weekly.

References

External links

Trade unionists from Washington (state)
American LGBT writers
The Stranger (newspaper) people
Writers from Seattle
Year of birth missing (living people)
Living people
21st-century LGBT people